Aladdin Jr. is a one-act, eleven-scene theatre musical adapted from the 1992 Walt Disney Animation Studios film Aladdin which is an adaptation of the folk tale Aladdin. The production runs between 60 and 80 minutes and includes five female parts, six male parts, and a chorus.

Description
Aladdin Jr. is a part of the Broadway Jr. series by Music Theatre International (MTI).  MTI's Broadway Jr. series adapts full-length musicals into approximately 60-minute productions that are more manageable for middle school aged performers.  Aladdin Jr. rights come in a kit that includes student scripts.  Also included is a choreography DVD and a performance/rehearsal CD.  The performance tracks are first on the CD and include all the music without voices, whereas the rehearsal CD provides the music along with recorded voices. Also included is a director's book with the full script as well as area to make notes and suggestions for staging.  The full score is included for music teachers or for a live orchestra.  

Both the story and music in this truncated version closely follow the original film. Songs from the Disney film include "Arabian Nights," "One Jump Ahead, "Friend Like Me," "Prince Ali," and "A Whole New World," There are new additional songs that weren't in the film that have been placed into the musical such as (Babak, Omar, Aladdin, Kassim) (Proud of your boy) (These Palace walls) and (High Adventure)

In 2018, MTI revised Aladdin Jr. to replicate the 2014 Broadway musical. Changing the show completely adding the new songs stated above. 

There are also similar musicals based on The Jungle Book, Cinderella, One Hundred and One Dalmatians, The Aristocats and Sleeping Beauty  but they have the word "Kids" at the end of the title instead of "Jr.".  MTI's "Kids" musicals are written for even younger performers and are shortened further to run approximately 30 minutes. The musicals based on Alice in Wonderland and Mulan are "Jr." versions, which like Aladdin Jr. are more detailed.

Synopsis
Source: MTI Shows

Genie and the Agrabahns welcome us to Agrabah, introducing Aladdin and his penniless pals, Babkak, Omar, and Kassim; Princess Jasmine and her doting father, the Sultan; and the evil Jafar and Iago ("Overture/ Arabian Nights). Inside the marketplace, a Shop Owner berates the hungry Aladdin for stealing a loaf of bread, causing Razoul and his Guards to chase after him and his pals ("One Jump Ahead") until they escape. Afterward, when an Apple Vendor reviles two Beggars, Aladdin offers them his bread and defends them when Prince Abdullah and his attendants shove them out of his way ("One Jump Ahead - Reprise / Proud of Your Boy").

In the palace, Jafar plots with Iago to become Sultan as Jasmine rejects Prince Abdullah and the Sultan declares that she must marry by the next moon. Frustrated, Jasmine confides in her attendants - Isir, Manal, and Rajah - who encourage her to open up to experiences beyond the palace ("These Palace Walls"). As Jasmine disguises herself and takes off to heed their advice, Jafar and Iago invoke an incantation, and a Spooky Voice reveals that Aladdin is the key to finding a magic lamp that will grant Jafar the power to become Sultan.

In the marketplace, Aladdin and his friends put on a show in the hope of earning some money ("Babkak, Omar, Aladdin, Kassim"). When Aladdin notices the seemingly out-of-place Jasmine and offers to show her around the marketplace, Jasmine unthinkingly takes an apple from a vendor, catching the attention of the guards. The two escape together and share their mutual experience of feeling "trapped." When the guards discover and detain them, Jasmine reveals herself to be the Princess and is escorted back to the palace, vowing to get Aladdin released. In disguise, Jafar and Iago pay off the guards and lead Aladdin to the Cave of Wonders, where he is instructed to fetch only the lamp. Distracted by the treasures, Aladdin becomes trapped within the cave until he rubs the lamp and releases the all-powerful Genie ("Friend Like Me"), who helps him escape. Granting the first of Aladdin's three wishes, Genie transforms him into Prince Ali Ababwa, which Aladdin hopes will help him to woo Jasmine.

Back at the palace, Jafar, thinking that Aladdin is still trapped in the cave, informs a despondent Jasmine that the boy's sentence has already been carried out. Just then, Aladdin and his friends make a grand entrance as Prince Ali with his Entourage ("Prince Ali"), but his demeanor offends Jasmine, who storms off. Frustrated, Aladdin lashes out at his friends, who in turn abandon him and leave the palace.

Later, on the Princess's balcony, Prince Ali gains Jasmine's trust and invites her on a magic carpet ride ("A Whole New World"). After bidding her farewell, Aladdin is arrested by Jafar for trespassing in the Princess's private chambers.

Omar, returning to help Aladdin, witnesses his arrest and runs to tell his pals, who pledge to help him ("High Adventure"), but they too are detained as they storm the palace. Aladdin uses his second wish, and Genie frees them all.

Aladdin vows to tell Jasmine the truth, but changes his mind when she tells him he is to become Sultan after they wed. Unsure of his own moral character and ability, Aladdin fears he may need his third wish to succeed as a ruler. After a disappointed Genie turns his back on Aladdin and retreats into the lamp, Aladdin weighs his options and ultimately runs off to tell Jasmine the truth. He leaves behind the lamp, which Jafar and Iago gleefully take.

At the wedding, Jafar reveals Prince Ali's real identity ("Prince Ali - Reprise") and demands that Genie make him Sultan. Aladdin then tricks him into wishing to become the most powerful genie of all time - forever trapping him inside his own lamp. Using his last wish, Aladdin frees Genie; and the Sultan, moved by Aladdin's courage and Jasmine's wisdom, alters the law so that the Princess can rule Agrabah and marry whomever she chooses. Picking Aladdin, Jasmine and all of Agrabah live happily, and freely, ever after ("Finale").

Characters
Source:

Aladdin
Babkak
Omar
Kassim
Genie
Iago
Isir, Manal, and Rajah
Jafar
Jasmine
Sultan
Razoul
Royal Guards
Agrabahns
Prince Abdullah
Attendants
Spooky Voice
Cave of Wonders
Ensemble
Entourage

References

External links
Aladdin, Jr. at the Broadway Junior Collection 
Aladdin, Jr. at MTI Show Space

Aladdin (franchise)
Musicals based on animated films